The Asia/Oceania Zone was one of three zones of regional Federation Cup qualifying competition in 1992.  All ties were played at the National Tennis Centre in Colombo, Sri Lanka on clay courts.

The eight teams were divided into two pools of four to compete in round-robin matches. After each of the ties had been played, the four teams that finished first and second in each of the respective pools would then move on to the two-round knockout stage of the competition. The team that won the knockout stage would go on to advance to the World Group.

Pool Stage
Date: 4–6 May

Knockout stage

  advanced to World Group.

References

 Fed Cup Profile, South Korea
 Fed Cup Profile, Philippines
 Fed Cup Profile, India
 Fed Cup Profile, Sri Lanka
 Fed Cup Profile, Chinese Taipei
 Fed Cup Profile, Thailand

See also
Fed Cup structure

 
Asia Oceania
Sport in Colombo
Tennis tournaments in Sri Lanka